Shoko Kashiki (born 9 November 1993) is a Japanese professional racing cyclist, who currently rides for UCI Women's Continental Team .

References

External links

1993 births
Living people
Japanese female cyclists
Komazawa University alumni
Place of birth missing (living people)
20th-century Japanese women
21st-century Japanese women